Toirdelbach is a masculine Irish given name. Forms of the name include Toirdhealbhach, Tárlach, and Traolach. An Anglicised form is Turlough. The names are ultimately derived from the Irish toirdhealbh meaning "prompting", and originated as a byname meaning "instigator".

People with the name

Tairrdelbach
 Tairrdelbach Ua Conchobair, called Toirdelbach Mór, king of Ireland (d. 1156)

Tarlach
 Tarlach Ó Mealláin, Irish Franciscan
 Tarlach Mac Suibhne, Irish piper
 Tarlach Rua Mac Dónaill, Irish poet

Toirdelbach
 Toirdelbach mac Murchada meic Briain, grandson of Brian Boru (d. 1014)
 Toirdhealbhach mac Ruaidhrí Ó Conchobhair, king of Connacht (d. 1239)
 Toirdelbach Ó Conchobair, king of Connacht (d. 1345)
 Toirdelbach Ua Briain, king of Munster (d. 1086)

Toirdhealbhach
 Toirdhealbhach Óg Donn Ó Conchobair, king of Connacht (d. 1461)

Turlough
 Turlough Luineach O'Neill (1530–1595) Ulster chieftain
 Turlough MacShane O'Neill (died 1608), Irish landowner
 Turlough Ó Carolan (1670–1738) Irish harper
 Vislor Turlough, a Doctor Who fictional character

Places

In Ireland
 Turlough, a village in County Mayo
 Turlough Hill, an electricity generating station in County Wicklow

References

Irish-language masculine given names